PSH may refer to:

Science and technology
 Paroxysmal sympathetic hyperactivity
 Past surgical history
 Petrograd Standard Hundred, a measure of timber
 PlayStation Home
 Plurisubharmonic function
 Polythematic structured-subject heading system, controlled vocabulary
 Portable Surgical Hospital
 Prebisch–Singer hypothesis, which argues that a country producing mainly primary products will see its terms of trade deteriorate
 Psychosocial hypothesis
 Pumped-storage hydroelectricity

Places
 Parma Senior High School
 Pershore railway station, England; National Rail station code PSH
 Primary State Highways (Washington), major state highways in Washington State from 1905 to 1964
 Public Service Hall - а Georgian government agency providing essential public services e.g. property registry, birth death and marriage registration, archive inquiries etc.

People
 Philip Seymour Hoffman (1967–2014), American actor

See also 
 PSSH (disambiguation)